Brilliant Green may refer to:

 The Brilliant Green, Japanese rock band
 The Brilliant Green (album), the band's eponymous debut album
 Brilliant green (dye), a dye and antiseptic

See also
 Emerald (color)